The 2016–17 season was Unione Sportiva Sassuolo Calcio's fourth consecutive season in the top-flight of Italian football. Sassuolo is competed in Serie A, finishing 12th, in the Coppa Italia, being eliminated in the round of 16, and in the UEFA Europa League, where they were eliminated in the group stage. Sassuolo had achieved their first ever Europa League qualification after finishing 6th at the end of the 2015–16 season.

Players

Squad information

Players in the squad list submitted to UEFA for UEFA Europa League group stage are indicated by EL.

Transfers

In

Loans in

Out

Pre-season and friendlies

Competitions

Overall

Last updated: 28 May 2017

Serie A

League table

Results summary

Results by round

Matches

Note

Coppa Italia

UEFA Europa League

Third qualifying round

Play-off round

Group stage

Statistics

Appearances and goals

|-
! colspan=14 style=background:#dcdcdc; text-align:center| Goalkeepers

|-
! colspan=14 style=background:#dcdcdc; text-align:center| Defenders

|-
! colspan=14 style=background:#dcdcdc; text-align:center| Midfielders

|-
! colspan=14 style=background:#dcdcdc; text-align:center| Forwards

|-
! colspan=14 style=background:#dcdcdc; text-align:center| Players transferred out during the season

Goalscorers

Last updated: 28 May 2017

Clean sheets

Last updated: 28 May 2017

Disciplinary record

Last updated: 28 May 2017

References

U.S. Sassuolo Calcio seasons
Sassuolo
Sassuolo